Krout is a surname. Notable people with the surname include:

Caroline Virginia Krout (1852–1931), American author, sister of Mary
Mary Hannah Krout (1851–1927), American journalist, author, and women's suffrage activist

See also
 Krout Glacier

English-language surnames